"I'll Keep Your Memory Vague" is the third single (final in the U.S. because "Talking To The Walls" was only released in Canada) and also the third track on Finger Eleven's fifth studio album Them vs. You vs. Me. It is also Finger Eleven's second single to be played on adult contemporary radio stations ("One Thing" is the other).

Music video
It starts with a woman in her parked car, crying while looking at a picture of a man & her, with the band playing nearby in a parking lot in the night with lights surrounding them. As the woman drives she sees the man in the reflection of her mirror. She then gets out of the car to check if he's there, when he's not she wanders off in the streets, grabbing Scott Anderson thinking it's him. She goes into a late-night shop and sees the man through the aisles, seeing multiples of him. She then heads to the washroom as she screams and cries and looks in the mirror at the end when all along the reflection shows it is the man as he grabs a crumpled picture of him and the woman as the video ends. The couple in the video is speculated to have been together, but nothing is verified.

Charts

Weekly charts

Year-end charts

References

Finger Eleven songs
2007 singles
2007 songs
Wind-up Records singles
Song recordings produced by Johnny K
Rock ballads